The Smeltertown Formation is a geologic formation in New Mexico, which is particularly well exposed at Cerro de Cristo Rey near El Paso, Texas. It preserves fossils dating back to the early Cretaceous period.

Description
The formation consists of gray shale with some interbedded siltstone and silty limestone, with some fine grained sandstone towards the top of the formation. It rests conformably on the Del Norte Formation and is conformably overlain by the Muleros Formation.

Fossils
Fossils are uncommon in the formation. However, the rare nautiloid Cymatoceras cf. C. Loeblichi Miller and Harris has been recovered from the formation, as have fossil ophiuroids (brittle stars). The formation is also the type location for the bryozoan Reptomulticava texana. The distribution of foram fossils in the formation (planktonic species more common towards the bottom and benthic species more common towards the top) suggests that the sea in the area was shallowing during deposition of the formation.

See also

 List of fossiliferous stratigraphic units in New Mexico
 Paleontology in New Mexico

Footnotes

Cretaceous formations of New Mexico